The Cégep de Sorel-Tracy is a post-secondary education institution located in Sorel-Tracy, Quebec, Canada.

History
The college traces its origins to the merger of several institutions which became public ones in 1967, when the Quebec system of CEGEPs was created.

Partnerships
The College of General and Vocational Education is affiliated with the ACCC, and CCAA.

Programs
The CEGEP offers two types of programs: pre-university and technical. The pre-university programs, which take two years to complete, cover the subject matters which roughly correspond to the additional year of high school given elsewhere in Canada in preparation for a chosen field in university. The technical programs, which take three-years to complete, applies to students who wish to pursue a skill trade. In addition Continuing education and services to business are provided.

See also
List of colleges in Quebec
Higher education in Quebec

References

External links
Cégep de Sorel-Tracy Website in French

Sorel-Tracy
Sorel-Tracy
Education in Montérégie
Buildings and structures in Montérégie